Mohamed Aidara (born 24 December 1989) is a Senegalese professional footballer who last played as a midfielder for Altona Magic.

Career
Before signing a contract with VfB Oldenburg he played for Lüneburger SK Hansa and FSV Frankfurt II. However, due to a compensation issue with his previous club USC Paloma, he did not play a competitive game for FSV Frankfurt II.

Aidara played three seasons with VfB Oldenburg in the Regionalliga Nord between 2012 and 2015, making 87 appearances and scoring three goals. In June 2015, he signed a two-year deal with SV Werder Bremen II of the 3. Liga.

He was released by Werder Bremen at the end of the 2016–17 season.

On 22 October 2019, Aidara joined Danish 1st Division club Næstved BK.

Personal life
He is the younger brother of Kassim Aidara who also is a footballer.

References

External links
 
 
 Mohamed Aidara at Kicker

1989 births
Living people
Footballers from Dakar
Senegalese footballers
Regionalliga players
3. Liga players
Belgian Pro League players
FC St. Pauli players
SC Concordia von 1907 players
USC Paloma players
FSV Frankfurt players
VfB Oldenburg players
SV Werder Bremen II players
Royal Excel Mouscron players
Lüneburger SK Hansa players
Næstved Boldklub players
Altona Magic SC players
Senegalese expatriate footballers
Association football midfielders
Senegalese expatriate sportspeople in Germany
Expatriate footballers in Germany
Senegalese expatriate sportspeople in Belgium
Expatriate footballers in Belgium
Senegalese expatriate sportspeople in Denmark
Expatriate men's footballers in Denmark
Expatriate soccer players in Australia
Senegalese expatriate sportspeople in Australia